Bloemfontein Young Tigers are a South African football (soccer) club based in Bloemfontein that participates in the Vodacom League. 
The club was formed in 1925 and plays currently at Tempe Military Base.

Association football clubs established in 1925
Soccer clubs in South Africa
SAFA Second Division clubs
Soccer clubs in the Free State (province)
1925 establishments in South Africa